Villetaneuse is a commune in the Seine-Saint-Denis department, in the northern suburbs of Paris, France.

Heraldry

Population

Education

Primary and secondary schools
The commune has four preschools (maternelles) and four primary schools, with 150 employees total. They are:
 Preschools: Anne Frank, Jacqueline Quatremaire, Jules Verne, Henri Wallon
 Elementary schools: Jean-Baptiste Clément, Paul Langevin, Jules Vallès, Jules Verne

Two junior high schools (collèges), operated by Seine-Saint-Denis, are in the commune: Lucie Aubrac and Jean Vilar. Students in Villetaneuse attend senior high schools/sixth-form colleges (lycées), operated by Ile de France, in various surrounding municipalities.

University
Villetaneuse is well known for its university named "Université Paris XIII or Paris Nord", in particular: the Polytechnique Science Institut "Institut Galilée" where Material Science, Computer Science, Mathematics, Physics, Electronics, Chemical Engineering, and Chemistry are taught.

Transport
Villetaneuse is served by no station of the Paris Métro, RER, or suburban rail network. The closest station to Villetaneuse is Épinay – Villetaneuse station on the Transilien Paris – Nord suburban rail line. This station is located in the neighboring commune of Épinay-sur-Seine,  from the town center of Villetaneuse. It takes less than 15 min to commute to Paris by train.

See also
Communes of the Seine-Saint-Denis department

References

External links

 Home page 

Communes of Seine-Saint-Denis